The Unicode and HTML for the Hebrew alphabet are found in the following tables. The Unicode Hebrew block extends from U+0590 to U+05FF and from U+FB1D to U+FB4F. It includes letters, ligatures, combining diacritical marks (niqqud and cantillation marks) and punctuation.  The Numeric Character References are included for HTML.  These can be used in many markup languages, and they are often used on web pages to create the Hebrew glyphs presentable by the majority of web browsers.

Unicode

Character table

Compact table 

Note I: The ligatures  are intended for Yiddish. They are not used in Hebrew.
Note II: The symbol  is called gershayim and is a punctuation mark used in the Hebrew language to denote acronyms. It is written before the last letter in the acronym. Gershayim is also the name of a note of cantillation in the reading of the Torah, printed above the accented letter.

Remaining graphs are in the Alphabetic Presentation Forms block:

In Hebrew spelling this would be pronounced .   is written  under the previous letter then .

HTML code tables

Note: HTML numeric character references can be in decimal format (&#DDDD;) or hexadecimal format (&#xHHHH;).  For example, &#1490; and &#x05D2; (where "05D2" in hexadecimal is the same as "1490" in decimal) both represent the Hebrew letter gimmel.

See also
 Alphabetic Presentation Forms (Unicode block)
 Hebrew (Unicode block)
 Hebrew alphabet
 Niqqud
 Yiddish orthography

External links
 Unicode Hebrew: Range 0590-05FF
 Alphabetic Presentation Forms: Range FB00-FB4F
 Hebrew Unicode Chart

Character encoding
Hebrew alphabet